The 33rd Hundred Flowers Awards was held on September 24, 2016 in Tangshan, Hebei province.

Awards and nominations

Best Film

Best Director

Best Screenplay

Best Actor

Best Actress

Best Supporting Actor

Best Supporting Actress

Best Newcomer

Lifetime Achievement award
Tao Yuling
Ge Cunzhuang
Liang Xin
Xie Fang

Outstanding Film
Wolf Warriors

Outstanding Film Special Commendation
The Taking of Tiger Mountain

References

External links

2016